The 2011 PBA D-League Foundation Cup is the inaugural tournament of the PBA Developmental League.

Format
The following format will be observed for the duration of the conference:
The teams were divided into 2 groups.

Group A:
NLEX Road Warriors
Freego Jeans
RnW Pacific Pipes
Black Water Elite
Pharex Naproxen Sodium Bidang Generix
PC Gilmore Wizards

Group B:
Maynilad Water Dragons
Junior Powerade Tigers
Max! Bond Super Glue Sumos
Cobra Energy Drink Iron Men
Cafe France Bakers
Cebuana Lhuillier Gems
FCA Cultivators

Teams in a group will play against each other once, Group A will play an extra game, the pairings of which will be decided by lottery; 6 games per team; Teams are then seeded by basis on win–loss records. Ties are broken among point differentials of the tied teams. The top two teams of each group will advance to the semifinals while the next four teams of each group will qualify to the quarterfinals.
The two bottom-ranked teams in Group B will play a knockout game for the last playoff spot.
Quarterfinal phase (knockout games):
first round
Q1: A3 vs. B6
Q2: A4 vs. B5
Q3: B3 vs. A6
Q4: B4 vs. A5
second round
Q5: A1 vs. Q4
Q6: A2 vs. Q3
Q7: B1 vs. Q2
Q8: B2 vs. Q1
Semifinals (knockout games):
SFA: Q5 vs. Q8
SFB: Q6 vs. Q7
Best-of-three Finals: winners of the semifinals.

Elimination round

Playoff round
The top two teams of each group will be automatically in the quarter-finals second round. But, in group B, there are seven teams. So, the two teams who are in the lowest standings will be battle for the knockout stage. It will be Junior Powerade Tigers and the Cafe France.

From Quarter-finals to Semi-finals the game is always knockout. But in the finals, it is best of 3 series.

Bracket

Knockout stage
{{basketballbox|bg=#eee |date=May 24 |place=San Juan Gym, San Juan, Metro Manila
|team1=Junior Powerade Tigers |score1=77|team2=Cafe France |score2=65
}}

Quarterfinals

First roundQ1 Q2Q3Q4Second roundQ5Q6Q7Q8Semi-finalsSF1SF2FinalsF1F2'''

References

See also
List of developmental and minor sports leagues
PBA Developmental League
Philippine Basketball Association

PBA D-League Foundation Cup
2010–11 in Philippine basketball